Karen Kleven (21 July 1925 – 28 March 2021) was a Norwegian politician for the Conservative Party.

She served as a deputy representative to the Parliament of Norway from Finnmark during the terms 1973–1977 and 1977–1981. In total she met during 26 days of parliamentary session. She hailed from Hammerfest.

References

1925 births
2021 deaths
People from Hammerfest
Deputy members of the Storting
Conservative Party (Norway) politicians
Finnmark politicians
Norwegian women in politics
Women members of the Storting